Ivana Ninković (born 15 December 1995 in Trebinje, Bosnia and Herzegovina) is a Bosnian swimmer who swims for Swimming Club  'Olymp' Banja Luka and for Bosnia and Herzegovina national swim team. She started swimming at her hometown's local swimming club 'Leotar Trebinje' at an early age.

As of 2013, she is an engineering student at Arizona State University where she competes with the Sun Devils team.

Competitions

2011
Ivana participated at Balkan Junior Swimming Championship where she won 3rd place in the 50m Breaststroke. Her first European Competition was LEN: European Junior Championships.

References

1995 births
Living people
Bosnia and Herzegovina female swimmers
Swimmers at the 2012 Summer Olympics
Olympic swimmers of Bosnia and Herzegovina
People from Trebinje
Serbs of Bosnia and Herzegovina